Nellai Express is a Superfast train operated by the Southern Railway zone of the Indian Railways. It runs on all days connecting  with  via Villupuram Junction, Tiruchirappalli Junction and Madurai Junction through the chord line. It is now running with LHB (Linke Hoffman Busch) and is maintained at Tirunelveli Junction.

History
The town is also called 'Nellai' after the Nellaiyappar temple in Tirunelveli. Hence, this train from Nellai is named Nellai Superfast Express

Rakes 
The service has all class of coaches in Indian railways like 1 AC First cum Second AC Coach,  2 AC Two-tier coaches,  4 AC Three-tier coaches, 9 Sleeper Coaches,3 Unreserved and 2 luggage, brake cum generator van. It is now running with LHB (Linke Hoffman Busch)and is maintained at Tirunelveli Junction.

See also
KSR Bengaluru–Nagercoil Express
Chennai Egmore–Kanyakumari Express
Pothigai Express
Chendur Express
Pandian Express
Ananthapuri Express
Pandian Express
Chennai Egmore–Nagercoil Weekly Superfast Express
Pearl City Express
Sethu Express
Rockfort Express
Nilgiri Express
Tambaram–Nagercoil Antyodaya Express

Notes

References

External links
 Nellai Express on Indian Rail Info

Named passenger trains of India
Transport in Tirunelveli
Rail transport in Tamil Nadu
Express trains in India